Law & Order: LA, originally titled Law & Order: Los Angeles, is an American police procedural and legal drama television series set in Los Angeles, where it was produced. Created and produced by Dick Wolf and developed by Blake Masters, it premiered on NBC on September 29, 2010, as the fifth series in Wolf's Law & Order franchise.  Law & Order: LA debuted after the original Law & Order ended its 20-year run the previous spring.
The show received a full-season pickup on October 18, 2010. On January 18, 2011, however, NBC announced that it was putting the series on hold indefinitely. According to a representative of the show, the scheduling change was not caused entirely by the mid-season cast shake-up. The network later announced a return date for the series, April 11, 2011; and the final episode scheduled for July 11, 2011. On May 13, 2011, NBC canceled the series after one season.

Production

History and development
On January 10, 2010, NBC programming chief Angela Bromstad announced at the winter TCA Press Tour that the network was in talks with Dick Wolf about producing a new series, titled Law & Order: Los Angeles, and indicated that NBC was seeking to hire writers for a pilot.

Reports in early May suggested that NBC had made the decision to pick up Law & Order: Los Angeles with a 13-episode order for fall 2010, having brought Brotherhood creator Blake Masters on board to co-create the new series set in Los Angeles with Wolf. NBC confirmed the new series order on May 14, 2010.  René Balcer served as showrunner and head writer on the series and executive produced alongside the pilot's writer Blake Masters, Wolf, Peter Jankowski and Christopher Misiano, previously of The West Wing.

The show received a full season pickup on October 18, 2010. It underwent a cast shake-up for a creative overhaul in January 2011; Skeet Ulrich, Regina Hall, and Megan Boone departed the cast. The show jumped to the episodes with the new cast airing first. The remaining episodes with the original cast began airing on May 30, 2011 with the episode "Plummer Park".

Broadcast history
The show was originally broadcast in the Wednesday 10:00 p.m. timeslot after Law & Order: Special Victims Unit on NBC. Following the hiatus, the series moved to Monday nights at 10:00 p.m.

Cancellation
NBC canceled Law & Order: LA on May 13, 2011, almost one year after NBC canceled the original Law & Order series. NBC Chairman Robert Greenblatt gave creator Dick Wolf credit for reinventing the show and said, "We tried but we didn't have the time period to bring it back if it isn't going to show signs of growth."

Greenblatt also said to TV Guide when they asked about the cancellation, "We moved it around, took it off the schedule and tried to revamp it. It improved significantly creatively, and it didn't have a great lead-in on Mondays. It was one of those tough decisions: do we stick with it or was it time to move on?" Before the upfronts Greenblatt added, "Law & Order: LA, I think we just didn't get it off the ground right. It was put on the schedule without a pilot last fall before I arrived. There was all kinds of chaos going on: the show did well then it was taken off. In a different scenario that might have worked better but we just thought it wasn't a strong enough player to continue into next season." Showrunner René Balcer released a video shortly after its cancellation was announced, urging fans to call NBC to renew the series, and stating that the season would end with a cliff-hanger.  (However, due to the episodes being aired out of sequence, the episode he referred to, "Hayden Tract", was in fact not the final episode to be aired.)

Law & Order: LA marks the third Law & Order series to be canceled by NBC; the second to be canceled after only one season, Law & Order: Trial by Jury—canceled in 2005—being the first.

Casting
The first casting was announced in June 2010 when Skeet Ulrich was cast as LAPD Detective Rex Winters; as the result of a creative overhaul, Ulrich's character was killed in the line of duty by a drug cartel. Corey Stoll portrays LAPD Detective Tomas "TJ" Jaruszalski, originally partnered with Rex Winters, later with Ricardo Morales.  Wanda De Jesus originally portrayed Lieutenant Arleen Gonzales on July 31, 2010, but left in September after filming only the first two episodes. Rachel Ticotin later joined the cast as Gonzales, replacing De Jesus, re-shooting her scenes after the pilot episode.

Alfred Molina was cast as Deputy District Attorney Ricardo Morales; later, his character resigns from the District Attorney's office out of frustration with the justice system and the prosecutorial politics. Molina's Morales returns to his old job as a police detective, replacing Ulrich's Detective Winters. Regina Hall played DDA Morales' partner, Deputy District Attorney Evelyn Price. Her character resigns from the district attorney's office shortly after Molina's DDA Morales does. Hall was written out during the show's creative overhaul.

Terrence Howard joined the cast as Deputy District Attorney Jonah "Joe" Dekker whose character was set to work alongside Deputy D.A. Morales; Howard and Molina splitting the workload, each appearing roughly in half the episodes, thus allowing the show to star feature film actors and the actors to stay active in movies. When Morales decides to go back to being a detective, Dekker becomes the sole DA, another effect of the creative overhaul. Megan Boone was featured as Junior Deputy District Attorney Lauren Stanton, Dekker's assistant. Boone was written out during the creative overhaul, with the explanation that her character moved to D.C. when her boyfriend got a job there.

Following the show's revamp, Law & Order actress Alana de la Garza reprised her role as Connie Rubirosa, now Dekker's new partner. Rubirosa moves from New York City to Los Angeles to be close to her ailing mother.

Cast and characters

Main cast 
 Alfred Molina as Ricardo Morales; a Deputy District Attorney turned Senior LAPD Detective

Police 
 Skeet Ulrich as Rex Winters; a Senior LAPD Detective
 Corey Stoll as Tomas "TJ" Jaruszalski; a Junior LAPD Detective
 Wanda de Jesus and Rachel Ticotin as Arleen Gonzales; an LAPD Lieutenant

Prosecutors 
 Terrence Howard as Jonah "Joe" Dekker; a Deputy District Attorney
 Alana de la Garza as Connie Rubirosa; a Deputy District Attorney
 Regina Hall as Evelyn Price; a Deputy District Attorney
 Megan Boone as Lauren Stanton; a Deputy District Attorney

Other
 Peter Coyote as Jerry Hardin; a District Attorney

Format

The description of the series, posted on NBC's official website, reads, "From Dick Wolf, comes a foray into the glitz, glamour and guilt of Los Angeles. From the tony Beverly Hills to the seedy side of Hollywood, LAPD's elite Robbery Homicide Division is on the case. Fusing classic ripped-from-the-headlines storytelling with the backdrop of LA, the series delves into the high-profile crimes of the West Coast." The format is similar to the other Law & Order shows, though adapted to the Los Angeles criminal justice system: each episode starts by depicting a crime, then presents the LAPD investigation, the prosecution by the L.A. County District Attorney, and the trial in the Los Angeles Superior Court. The crimes prosecuted  are codified in the California Penal Code. As in other L.A. police procedural shows, crimes are sometimes referred to by their Penal Code section numbers.

Law & Order: LA is the only American Law & Order series set outside of New York City.

An opening narration was not used for the first two episodes. Starting with the third episode, the Steven Zirnkilton narration for the original Law & Order is used. The narration was modified after the hiatus to explicitly mention Los Angeles.

Originally, the series was the first in the franchise not to use a full-length theme showcasing each of the cast members. Instead, this variant utilized a short opening that displayed only the show's title and "Created by Dick Wolf". Starting with the sixth episode, this short opening was dropped completely; the series' cast is presented during the show's first act, before the episode's list of guest stars and crew.

With the cast changes after the hiatus, a full title sequence similar to the other series in the franchise was introduced. The show opens with a night view of the city skyline in gold. As the narration is spoken, labels of areas in and around the city appear as if floating above; from those letters float together to form the series title. After the opening scene in which the crime is established, a credits sequence shows the series' principals in slow motion while a faint arrangement of the traditional Law & Order theme plays.

The show continues to use the iconic Friz Quadrata typeface that is used throughout the Law & Order franchise for its credits.

Episodes
The series frequently uses stories that are based on real crimes. Such episodes fictionalize a real crime by changing the details, similar to the earlier L.A. based crime series Dragnet. The episode titles are named for Los Angeles neighborhoods.

The series was released on DVD as a five disc set. All 22 episodes are included, as well as bonus features.

Video game
Telltale Games was originally set to develop a Law & Order: LA video game due for release in 2011. However, due to the cancellation of the show, Telltale Games decided to make another game set in the Law & Order universe called Law & Order: Legacies.

Home media
On September 20, 2011, Universal Pictures Home Entertainment released Law & Order: Los Angeles – The Complete Series on DVD in Region 1.

Reception

U.S. television ratings
Law & Order: LA aired on Monday nights, following The Event.

The debut of Law & Order: LA did fairly well, bringing in 10.6 million viewers and averaging a 3.2 rating with viewers ages 18–49. That was enough to dominate the 10 p.m. slot, and give NBC its biggest show of the week so far, and improve the network's time slot average by 63 percent versus last season. Although when it returned revamped on Monday night on April 11, 2011 back-to-back, the episodes together averaged 6.10 million viewers with a 1.5/4% rating with viewers ages 18–49.

Awards and honors

References

General references that apply to most episodes

External links
  on Wolf Entertainment
 
 
 

 
2010s American crime drama television series
2010s American legal television series
2010s American mystery television series
2010s American police procedural television series
LA
2010 American television series debuts
2011 American television series endings
English-language television shows
Fictional portrayals of the Los Angeles Police Department
NBC original programming
Television shows set in Los Angeles
American television spin-offs
Television series by Universal Television
Television series created by Dick Wolf
Television series by Wolf Films
Television series based on actual events
Television series about prosecutors